Ceragenia bicornis is a species of beetle in the family Cerambycidae. It was described by Fabricus in 1801.

References

Trachyderini
Beetles described in 1801